Sepp Wiegand (born January 9, 1991, in Zwönitz) is a German rally driver. He competed in most events of the Intercontinental Rally Challenge in 2012.

Career results

WRC results

WRC Academy results

† Ineligible to score points.

WRC 2 results

Complete IRC results

ERC results

External links

Official website
Wiegand at eWRC

1991 births
Living people
World Rally Championship drivers
Intercontinental Rally Challenge drivers
German rally drivers
European Rally Championship drivers
Racing drivers from Saxony
Volkswagen Motorsport drivers
Škoda Motorsport drivers